This is a list of years in Italian television.

Twenty-first century

Twentieth century

See also 
 List of years in Italy
 Lists of Italian films
 List of years in television

Television
Television in Italy by year
Italian television